Constant maturity refers to have a fixed (constant) maturity.
It may refer to:
 Constant maturity credit default swap
 Constant maturity swap
 Constant-maturity treasury